Calliostoma heros is a species of sea snail, a marine gastropod mollusk in the family Calliostomatidae.

Some authors place this taxon in the subgenus Calliostoma (Ampullotrochus)

Description

Distribution
This marine species occurs off New Caledonia.

References

 Marshall, B.A., 1995. Calliostomatidae (Gastropoda: Trochoidea) from New Caledonia, the Loyalty Islands, and the northern Lord Howe Rise. Mémoires du Muséum national d'Histoire naturelle 167: 381-458

External links

heros
Gastropods described in 1995